William Walsh, (7 November 1804 – 11 August 1858),  was an archbishop of the Roman Catholic Archdiocese of Halifax. He was born in Waterford, Co. Waterford, Republic of Ireland and died in Halifax, Nova Scotia.

Biography

Walsh studied at St. John's College, Waterford and Maynooth College and was ordained in Waterford. Following ordination he ministered in Dublin.

Walsh became bishop of Halifax in 1845 and in 1852, was appointed archbishop of an expanded ecclesiastical province of Nova Scotia, also designated as Halifax. He became the first archbishop in British North America outside Quebec.

On 15 September 1856, Walsh confirmed as Mi'kmaq Grand Chief Jacques-Pierre Peminuit Paul at St. Mary's Basilica (Halifax), Paul also receiving a medal from Pope Pius IX and a written endorsement from the Lt. Governor, Sir John Gaspard Le Marchant.

References

 Biography at the Dictionary of Canadian Biography Online
 Official Website for the Holy Cross Cemetery.

1804 births
1858 deaths
19th-century Irish Roman Catholic priests
19th-century Roman Catholic archbishops in Canada
Irish emigrants to Canada (before 1923)
People from County Waterford
Alumni of St Patrick's College, Maynooth
Roman Catholic bishops of Halifax
Roman Catholic archbishops of Halifax
Alumni of St John's College, Waterford